The 2nd arrondissement of Lyon is one of the nine arrondissements of the City of Lyon.

History
The first five arrondissements of Lyon were created by the Decree of March 24, 1852, which included the 2nd arrondissement.

The current mayor is Denis Broliquier.

Geography

Area and demographics
The 2nd arrondissement is the most commercial and most lively ones of Lyon.
 Area: 
 1990 : 27,971 inhabitants
 2006 : 30,276 inhabitants
 Relative density :

Districts
The districts (quarters) of the 2nd arrondissement are : 
 Les Cordeliers
 Bellecour
 Les Célestins
 La Confluence
 Ainay
 Perrache
 Sainte-Blandine

Streets and squares
 Cours Charlemagne
 Cours de Verdun
 Cours Suchet
 Passage de l'Argue
 Palais de la Bourse
 Place Ampère
 Place Bellecour
 Place Antonin-Poncet
 Place Carnot
 Place de la République
 Place des Célestins
 Place des Jacobins
 Quai Jules Courmont
 Quai Rambaud
 Rue de Brest
 Rue de la Bourse
 Rue de la Poulaillerie
 Rue de la République
 Rue des Archers
 Rue des Marronniers
 Rue Édouard-Herriot
 Rue Émile-Zola
 Rue Mercière
 Rue Victor-Hugo

Landmarks and monuments

 Basilique Saint-Martin d'Ainay
 Brasserie Georges
 Église Saint-Bonaventure
 Grande synagogue de Lyon
 La Bourse du Commerce
 Hôtel des Finances
 Hôtel Terminus
 Prison Saint-Paul
 Collège-lycée Ampère
 Musée des Confluences
 Musée de l'Imprimerie
 Chapelle de la Trinité
 Patinoire Charlemagne
 La Sucrière
 Orange Cube

Transportation
This zone is served by the metro lines  and  :
 Lyon Metro Line A : to Cordeliers, Bellecour, Ampère - Victor Hugo and Perrache (terminus)
 Lyon Metro Line D at Bellecour
 Tramway T1 at Perrache, Suchet, Sainte-Blandine et Montrochet (terminus)
 Tramway T2 at Perrache (terminus)

See also
Arrondissements of Lyon
 List of the streets in Lyon

References

External links
 Official site of the City Hall of the 2nd arrondissement